Jayaprakash Muliyil is an Indian epidemiologist and chairperson of the Scientific Advisory Committee of the National Institute of Epidemiology. He is also a former principal of the Christian Medical College, Vellore. 

He completed his undergraduate studies in Medicine and postgraduate studies in Community Medicine from Christian Medical College, Vellore. After that he joined as a faculty member in charge of the leprosy control programme at the Community Health and Development (CHAD) programme. In 1985 he went to Johns Hopkins University at Baltimore for further research, where he completed professional degrees of public health MPH and Doctor of Public Health (Dr.P.H.) in Epidemiology at JHSPH Department of Epidemiology.

References

External links
Coronavirus — In conversation with top epidemiologist Jayaprakash Muliyil | The Hindu In Focus Podcast
PubMed search  -  Jayaprakash Muliyil

Indian epidemiologists
Scientists from Kerala
Year of birth missing (living people)
Living people

Johns Hopkins University alumni
People in public health
Indian medical academics
Indian medical researchers
Indian leprologists